Straight Ahead is the fifth studio album by the American punk rock band Pennywise, released in 1999 via Epitaph Records. It contains the single "Alien."

Release
Straight Ahead was released in June 1999. In October 2000, the band played at Cypress Hill's Smoke Out Festival. The band toured Australia in November 2000; the dates were rescheduled from July 2000 as Lindberg's mother was suffering from cancer. They were supported by Frenzal Rhomb and Game Over.

Critical reception
Ox-Fanzine called the album "fast, direct, accomplished and powerful." CMJ New Music Report wrote that "the inescapable anger highlights, rather than buries, the metallic power riffs and inspired drumming." Phoenix New Times wrote that Straight Ahead is "rooted in West Coast surfer-skater party-punk, with rough-and-tumble melodies on top of briny torrents of guitars."

Track listing

Personnel

Pennywise
 Jim Lindberg - vocals
 Fletcher Dragge - guitar
 Randy Bradbury - bass
 Byron McMackin - drums

Production
 Darian Rundall - producer, engineer
 Eddie Schreyer - mastering
 Jesse Fischer - art direction, layout
 Dave Leamon - cover illustrator

Charts

Certifications

References

External links

Straight Ahead at YouTube (streamed copy where licensed)
 Official artist website

1999 albums
Pennywise (band) albums
Epitaph Records albums
Albums produced by Jerry Finn